Edmur Mesquita de Oliveira (17 May 1954 – 12 February 2022) was a Brazilian politician.

Biography
A member of the Brazilian Social Democracy Party, he served in the Legislative Assembly of São Paulo from 1999 to 2003. He died of COVID-19 in São Paulo on 12 February 2022, at the age of 67.

References

1954 births
2022 deaths
Members of the Legislative Assembly of São Paulo
Brazilian Social Democracy Party politicians
Brazilian Democratic Movement politicians
Deaths from the COVID-19 pandemic in São Paulo (state)